Kiilu Nyasha (May 22, 1939 – April 10, 2018) was an American Black Panther, journalist, and revolutionary activist. She was born in 1939, and grew up in New York City and San Francisco.

Career
In San Francisco, she joined the Black Panther Party and worked for a lawyer who defended the Party. She lived in San Francisco's Chinatown for over 40 years. In her life, she met and worked with other activists like Yuri Kochiyama and Jean-Bertrand Aristide.

After the Black Panther Party ended, Kiilu Nyasha became known as a journalist. She hosted a radio show where she did interviews and wrote articles for San Francisco newspapers. After Hurricane Katrina, she gave a speech at the University of Arizona about what she saw as the US government's racism. She often spoke out to say other revolutionaries who were in prison should be released; one of the prisoners she supported the most was Mumia Abu-Jamal, who is also a journalist. Kiilu Nyasha kept doing journalism and activism until she died.

References

Other websites
 The Official Website of Kiilu Nyasha
 Kiilu Nyasha's YouTube channel

Journalists from California
American civil rights activists
Writers from San Francisco
Writers from New York City
1939 births
2018 deaths
Members of the Black Panther Party